Steven Mahlubanzima Jafta is a South African politician from the African Independent Congress. He has sat in the National Assembly of South Africa since 2014.

References

Living people
African Independent Congress politicians
21st-century South African politicians
Members of the National Assembly of South Africa
Year of birth missing (living people)
Place of birth missing (living people)